Baccharis wrightii is a North American species of shrubs in the family Asteraceae known by the common name Wright's baccharis or false willow. It is native to northern Mexico (Chihuahua, Coahuila, Durango, Sonora) and the southwestern and south-central United States (Arizona, New Mexico, Texas, Oklahoma, Kansas, Colorado, Utah).

Description
Baccharis wrightii is a shrub up to 80 cm (32 inches) tall, the branches woody only at the bases. Flowering heads are usually borne one at a time on the ends of branches. The species grows on dry, sandy plains.

References

wrightii
Flora of North America
Plants described in 1852